Bureau of Alien Detectors (commonly initialized as BAD) is a 1996 American animated series by Saban Entertainment that aired on the UPN network's weekend-morning cartoon block UPN Kids. It was touted as "X-Files meets the A-Team," and only lasted for one season.

Ownership of the series passed to Disney in 2001 when Disney acquired Fox Kids Worldwide, which also includes Saban Entertainment. The series is not available on Disney+.

Plot
The series follows the exploits of the Phalanx Squad of the titular organization, led by war veteran Ben Packer, and consisting of resident psychic Casey Taylor, biologist Shane Sanderson, computer expert Colin Marcus, and super powered alien encounter survivor Moose Trengannu. But as they protect humanity from threats beyond the stars, some of the higher ups in B.A.D. have their own plans for the aliens.

Cast
Michael McConnohie as Ben Packer
Bree Anderson as Casey Taylor
Peter Spellos as Moose Trengganu
Tyrone Week as Colin Marcus
Reuben Daniels as Shane Sanderson
Sammy Lane
Walter Rego as Major V

Broadcast history
Bureau of Alien Detectors premiered on UPN during the fall of 1996 in the US, airing regularly on the network through to August 1997. Repeats later aired on Fox Family Channel in 1999 and as part of Jetix on Toon Disney in 2006. In Australia, the series was first shown on Network Ten's Cheez TV block beginning in May 1998. It aired again on Cheez TV in July 1999 and November 2000. In the UK, it aired during 2004 as part of the international Fox Kids channel.

Episodes

Reception
A 1997 report on violence in television by UCLA identified Bureau of Alien Detectors as one of the most violent children's programs to debut during the 1996-97 television season. It states "The show’s protagonists are a humorless lot who are principally characterized by their brooding natures and desire to 'kick alien butt.' This is consistent with the menacing and intense tone that permeates the program. Consisting principally of heavy amounts of laser gunfire and alien attacks, scenes of violence are almost non-stop throughout the show and occasionally result in characters being killed. This latter point is especially surprising since characters are virtually never killed in children’s cartoons."

In its entry for B.A.D. (Bureau of Alien Detectors; 1996-1997), the 2018 book The Encyclopedia of American Animated Television Shows states "Despite being promoted as both educational and entertaining, it was neither, borrowing too many tropes and concepts from live-action predecessors to be enjoyable on its own. Clearly, it was a series designed to fill its time slot—and do nothing else."

References

External links

UPN Kids
UPN original programming
1996 American television series debuts
1996 American television series endings
1990s American animated television series
American children's animated action television series
American children's animated adventure television series
American children's animated horror television series
American children's animated science fiction television series
Animated television series about extraterrestrial life
Fox Kids
Jetix original programming
Television series by Saban Entertainment
English-language television shows